Bezruky (Безручки) is a village in the Kharkiv Raion of Kharkiv Oblast in Ukraine. The area was invaded by Russia in 2022.

References

Villages in Kharkiv Raion